Vragel da Silva (born 29 March 1974) is a Brazilian former footballer and current manager. He last worked as the manager of Oberlausitz Neugersdorf.

Career 
Born in Campo Grande, Vragel da Silva began his career in Brazil for Campo Grande. He went on to play in Denmark for Brøndby, and in Germany for Karlsruher SC and SSV Ulm.

References

External links

Living people
1974 births
People from Campo Grande
Association football defenders
Brazilian footballers
Brazilian expatriate footballers
Campo Grande Atlético Clube players
Brøndby IF players
Karlsruher SC players
SSV Ulm 1846 players
FC Energie Cottbus players
Danish Superliga players
Bundesliga players
Expatriate men's footballers in Denmark
Expatriate footballers in Germany
Sportspeople from Mato Grosso do Sul